Glottiphyllum surrectum is a species of succulent plant, in the family Aizoaceae. It is indigenous to arid areas of the Little Karoo, in the Western Cape, South Africa.

Description
The stems are horizontal but the leaves are slender, erect and rounded in cross-section.

The seed capsule is rounded and raised at the top (valves high and rim low), with a hard, woody (not spongy) base, and no valve wings or awns.

References

surrectum
Taxa named by Adrian Hardy Haworth
Taxa named by Louisa Bolus